The Heck Seamount is a seamount located in the Pacific Ocean off the coast of central Vancouver Island, British Columbia, Canada.

References
 British Columbia Marine Topography

See also
 Volcanism of Canada
 Volcanism of Western Canada
 List of volcanoes in Canada

Seamounts of the Pacific Ocean
Volcanoes of British Columbia
Seamounts of Canada